Ionel Daniel Dănciulescu (born 6 December 1976) is a Romanian former professional footballer who played as a forward.

He holds the all-time record for the most competitive appearances in Liga I, with 515 games played over the course of twenty years. He is the second-highest goalscorer in the history of Liga I with 214 goals, only behind Dudu Georgescu with 252. He also scored 35 goals in the Cupa României.

Club career

Early years and Electroputere Craiova
Born in Slatina, Romania, Ionel Dănciulescu started playing football in his hometown as a youngster for CSȘ Slatina, alongside Claudiu Niculescu, Ionuț Luțu and Augustin Chiriță under coach Ion Pârvulescu and was said to have great potential for striking a ball and to score goals.

In 1993, Dănciulescu joined Electroputere Craiova making his Divizia A debut on 6 October 1993 against the derby rival at that time Universitatea Craiova, which ended 2–2. Over the course of two seasons with Electroputere, he scored 8 goals in 31 league games playing alongside the likes of Ștefan Nanu, Gabriel Popescu, and two other (later teammates at Steaua), Sabin Ilie and Claudiu Răducanu. In 1995, Electroputere Craiova were relegated to the second league. Dănciulescu signed for Dinamo Bucharest and went on to become a promising striker.

Dinamo București
Having arrived in 1995, Dănciulescu only spent two seasons at Dinamo București, scoring 22 goals in 64 games.

Altay Izmir
During the first half of the 1997–98 season, Dănciulescu had a brief spell with Altay in the Turkish Super League in which he played seven games and scored one goal, being brought there by coach Marian Bondrea, alongside fellow Romanians Dănuţ Moisescu and Marius Coporan.

Steaua București
After returning from Turkey, Dănciulescu decided to join Romanian team Steaua București. He played four seasons with Steaua, scoring 54 goals in 129 league games. In the seasons 1997–98 and 2000–01 Steaua won the championship titles as well as the Romanian Cup in 1998–99 and a Romanian Supercup title in 2001.

In the second part of the season 2001–02 Dănciulescu had a conflict with both Gigi Becali, the boss of Steaua București, and Victor Pițurcă, Steaua's coach, and had to leave along with Ion Vlădoiu.

Return to Dinamo București
He signed again with Dinamo Bucharest, but at the beginning of this second spell he had probably the hardest in his career as Dinamo's fans were cussing him at games because he played for Steaua and scored against Dinamo. He even played in the second league at that time via Dinamo's satellite team Poiana Câmpina. He came back strong during the 2002–03 season, after he scored 16 goals in 26 games. The fans accepted him and he became the top-scorer of the team along with Claudiu Niculescu. The Romanian press called them the "N&D couple", a nickname inspired from the first letters of their family name and the Romanian pop band "N&D".

In 2004, he was named Romanian Footballer of the Year, after becoming the top goalscorer in the 2003–04 season of Divizia A and scoring 2 goals in 5 matches with the national team.
During his second spell with Dinamo, Dănciulescu won the Romanian League in the seasons 2003–04 and 2006–07, and two more Romanian Cups in 2002–03 and 2003–04. As of August 2008 he was the fourth overall goalscorer in the history of the Romanian First Division (with 187 goals), after Dudu Georgescu, Rodion Cămătaru and Marin Radu. He was top scorer in the 2007–08 season, scoring 21 goals for Dinamo Bucharest, which he also captained several times that season.

In the 2007–08 season he became the top goalscorer of Liga I, forming a couple in Dinamo's offence with Florin Bratu. The Romanian press called them "BD in action", a nickname inspired from the first letters of their family name and the Romanian movie "BD in action".

Shandong Luneng
In 2005, he was loaned out to China side Shandong Luneng, which paid him US$350,000 for 10 months. Dănciulescu scored 10 goals in 26 league games being the top-scorer of the team and helping them to reach the Chinese FA Cup final, where they finished runners-up.

Hércules
On 1 September 2009, Dănciulescu signed for Spanish side Hércules Alicante in the Segunda División securing a two-year deal. On 19 June 2010, Dănciulescu helped Hércules to promote to La Liga, after a break of 13 years, contributing 10 goals in 25 league games. He also scored two goals in the Spanish Cup against SD Huesca and Almería and became the overall top scorer of the team.

Third spell at Dinamo București
After only one year with Hércules, his contract was terminated so Dănciulescu came back to Dinamo in July 2010. He became a regular player for Dinamo in Ioan Andone's coaching spell and remained in the first squad in 2011, with Liviu Ciobotariu as manager. On 26 September 2011, he scored his 198th goal in Liga I in a match against Petrolul Ploiești, thus joining Rodion Cămătaru as the second most prolific goalscorer. On 17 October, Ionel Dănciulescu scored his 200th goal in Liga I, during a match against Ceahlăul Piatra Neamț. On 16 March 2013 after playing in a match against Petrolul Ploiești, Dănciulescu  became the first footballer that reached 500 appearances in the Romanian top-league Liga I.

International career
Dănciulescu won his first Romania cap on 3 March 1999 against Estonia, in a 2–0 victory.  However, he was never in the plans of Victor Pițurcă, the man who brought him on the national team first time against Estonia, and was never called up again, due to the dispute he had with Pițurcă when he was at Steaua. Dănciulescu played seven games including three at the 2006 and 2010 World Cup qualifiers during 2004 and 2009 being called up by Anghel Iordănescu and Răzvan Lucescu.

He played only eight games for Romania, his best match was a friendly against Germany which ended with Romania's victory, 5–1 when he scored his only two goals for Romania.

Career statistics

Club

International
Scores and results list Romania's goal tally first, score column indicates score after each Dănciulescu goal.

Honours
Steaua București
Liga I: 1997–98, 2000–01
Cupa României: 1998–99
Supercupa României: 1998
Dinamo București
Liga I: 2001–02, 2003–04, 2006–07
Cupa României: 2002–03, 2003–04, 2011–12
Supercupa României: 2012
Shandong Luneng
Chinese FA Cup runner-up: 2005
Individual
Liga I top scorer: 2003–04, 2007–08
Gazeta Sporturilor Romanian Footballer of the Year: 2004
Records
Most appearances in Liga I: 515
Second-highest goalscorer in Liga I: 214

References

External links
 
 
 

1976 births
Living people
Sportspeople from Slatina, Romania
Romanian footballers
Romania international footballers
Romania under-21 international footballers
Romanian expatriate footballers
Chinese Super League players
Liga I players
Liga II players
Süper Lig players
Segunda División players
FC Dinamo București players
FC Steaua București players
Altay S.K. footballers
Shandong Taishan F.C. players
Hércules CF players
FCM Câmpina players
Romanian expatriate sportspeople in China
Romanian expatriate sportspeople in Spain
Romanian expatriate sportspeople in Turkey
Expatriate footballers in China
Expatriate footballers in Spain
Expatriate footballers in Turkey
Romanian football managers
FC Dinamo București managers
Association football forwards